= Grass surface =

Grass surface may refer to:

- generally:
  - Lawn, an area of land covered with short grasses
  - Sod, or turf, the upper layer of soil and grass roots of a lawn
- specifically, the grass surface in particular contexts:
  - Grass court, in tennis
  - Sports turf, more broadly (e.g. Grass field or Football pitch#Turf)
  - a pavement type in airport runways
